Tomás Margalef (born in Paysandú 17 November 1977) is an Uruguayan cyclist. He competed in the Men's madison at the 2004 Summer Olympics.

References

1977 births
Living people
Uruguayan male cyclists
Olympic cyclists of Uruguay
Cyclists at the 2004 Summer Olympics
Place of birth missing (living people)